Pignoise is a Spanish rock band comprising three members: Álvaro on guitar and vocals, Polo on drums, and Pablo on bass.

Beginnings
After Álvaro, a former soccer player for teams such as Getafe CF and Real Madrid, suffered a serious injury, he began to play guitar and compose songs during his rehabilitation period. He finally quit football and created a band called PIG NOISE. The group later used many of the songs he composed while in rehabilitation. Later Polo, another former soccer player for Real Zaragoza and other teams, joined the group. The last to join was Pablo, a student who had come from Asturias to Madrid to study theater. Their popularity increased sharply after appearing in a very well known Spanish show, Los hombres de Paco.

During the elections in the Basque Autonomous Community the band played in a meeting created by the conservative Spanish political party Partido Popular. The band has been heavily criticized after that, but during an interview for 20minutos.es, the bandmembers said that they thought it was just an event for young people created by Partido Popular and concluded saying that they'll never play in a political meeting again.

Musical style and influences
Pignoise is described as a pop punk band. Even though they have been seen wearing NOFX shirts in music videos, their light punk rock characteristics and their predominant pop music sound makes them clearly a pop punk band. They may also be considered pop rock or alternative rock. The band cites Ramones, blink-182, Green Day, NoFX, Slick Shoes, Allister and The Offspring as some of their main influences.

Discography
The group has released seven discs. The first two were Melodías Desafinadas (Out-of-tune Melodies) and Esto No Es Un Disco de Punk (This Is Not a Punk Disc). Their third release is titled Anunciado en Televisión (Advertised on Television), which became a hit in Spain and whose first single, "Nada Que Perder" ("Nothing to Lose"), is the theme song of the television series Los Hombres de Paco.

Studioalbums
 Melodias Desafinadas (luno Records) - 2003
 Esto no es un disco de punk (luno Records) - 2005
 Anunciado en televisión (Warner Music Spain) - 2006
 Cuestión de gustos (Warner Music Spain) - 2007
 Año Zero (Sony Music) - 2010
 El tiempo y el espacio (Pignoise Records) - 2013
 Lo que queda por andar (Pignoise Records) - 2015
 Diversión (Pignoise Records) - 2022

Compilations
 Cuestión de directo (Warner Music Spain) - 2009

EPs
 Maqueta (self-released) - 2001
 Pignoise por dentro (Sony Music) - 2011

Singles
 Nada Que Perder - 2006
 Te Entiendo - 2006
 Sigo llorando por ti - 2006
 Sin ti - 2007
 Sube a mi cohete - 2007
 Pasar de cuartos (created to the Spain national football team) - 2008
 Estoy enfermo (feat. Melendi) - 2009
 Todo me da igual - 2010
 Cama vacía - 2010
 Quiero - 2010
 Bajo tu suela - 2010
 Nubes de algodón - 2011
 La prisión del tiempo - 2011
 La gravedad - 2013
 Prométeme - 2015
 Interrogante - 2017

References

External links

Pop punk groups
Spanish punk rock groups
Rock en Español music groups